Many species of plants, animals, and other organisms are considered invasive species in Italy.

Plants

 Ailanthus altissima (Tree of heaven)
 Amorpha fruticosa (Desert false indigo)
 Ambrosia artemisiifolia (Amrosia artemisifolia)
 Carpobrotus edulis (Hottentot fig)
 Caulerpa racemosa (Grape caulerpa)
 Caulerpa taxifolia, Mediterranean clone
 Crassula helmsii (Australian swamp stonecrop)
 Eichhornia crassipes (Water hyacinth)
 Elodea canadensis (Canadian pondweed)
 Gleditsia triacanthos (Honey locust)
 Heracleum mantegazzianum (Giant hogweed)
 Hydrocotyle ranunculoides (Floating pennywort)
 Impatiens glandulifera (Himalayan balsam)
 Myriophyllum aquaticum (Parrot feather)
 Reynoutria japonica (syn. Fallopia japonica) (Japanese knotweed)
 Robinia pseudoacacia (Black locust)

Fungi
 Ophiostoma ulmi (Dutch elm disease)

Animals

Platyhelminthes
 Bothriocephalus acheilognathi (Asian tapeworm)

Molluscs

Marine

 Crassostrea gigas (Pacific oyster)
 Crepidula fornicata (Common slipper shell)
 Rapana Venosa (Veined rapa whelk)

Freshwater
 Corbicula fluminea (Freshwater bivalve mollusk)
 Dreissena polymorpha (Zebra mussel)
 Potamopyrgus antipodarum (New Zealand mud snail)
 Sinanodonta woodiana (Chinese pond mussel)

Crustaceans

 Dikerogammarus villosus (Killer shrimp)
 Eriocheir sinensis (Chinese mitten crab) 
 Orconectes limosus (Eastern crayfish)
 Pacifastacus leniusculus (Signal crayfish)
 Procambarus clarkii (Louisiana crawfish)

Insects

 Aedes albopictus (Asian tiger mosquito)
 Cacyreus marshalli (Geranium bronze)
 Dryocosmus kuriphilus (Chestnut gall wasp)
 Drosophila suzukii (Spotted-wing drosophila)
 Harmonia axyridis (Asian lady beetle)
 Leptinotarsa decemlineata (Colorado beetle)
 Linepithema humile (Argentine ant)
 Ricania speculum (black planthopper)

Amphibians
 Lithobates catesbeianus (American Bullfrog)
 Xenopus laevis (African clawed frog)

Birds

 Alopochen aegyptiacus (Egyptian goose)
 Myiopsitta monachus (Monk parakeet) 
 Psittacula krameri (Rose-ringed parakeet)

Fish
 Ameiurus melas (Black bullhead)
 Gambusia affinis  (Eastern mosquitofish)
 Lepomis gibbosus (Pumpkinseed sunfish)
 Pseudorasbora parva (Stone moroko)
 Micropterus salmoides (Largemouth Bass)

Mammals

 Eutamias sibiricus (Siberian chipmunk)
 Callosciurus finlaysonii (Finlayson's squirrel)
 Mustela vison (American mink)
 Myocastor coypus (Coypu, nutria)
 Nyctereutes procyonoides (Raccoon dog)
 Ondatra zibethicus (Muskrat)
 Oryctolagus cuniculus (European rabbit)
 Rattus norvegicus (Brown rat)
 Rattus rattus (Black rat)
 Sciurus carolinensis (Grey squirrel)
 Procyon lotor (Common raccoon)

Reptiles
 Trachemys scripta elegans (Red-eared slider)

References

invasive species
Italy
L
Invasive species
Italy